Daniel Thomas Collins (July 12, 1854 in St. Louis, Missouri – September 21, 1883), was a professional baseball player who played pitcher in the Major Leagues from 1874 to 1876. Collins had played for the Chicago White Stockings and the Louisville Grays.

See also
 List of Major League Baseball annual strikeout leaders

References
 Baseball Reference

Chicago White Stockings players
Louisville Grays players
1854 births
1883 deaths
Major League Baseball pitchers
Major League Baseball outfielders
19th-century baseball players
Baseball players from Missouri